Saúl Méndez Rodríguez (Colón, 26 December 1969) is a Panamanian trade union leader, general secretary of the National Union of Construction and Similar Workers (SUNTRACS) since 2010 and presidential candidate of the Broad Front for Democracy in the general elections of May 2019.

Biography 

He was born in the city of Colón, being the son of Eustaquio Méndez, a former policeman of the province of Chiriquí, and Luzmila Rodríguez, a native of the province of Coclé.

References 

1969 births
Living people
Panamanian politicians
People from Colón, Panama